Dolibarr ERP CRM is an open source, free software package for companies of any size, foundations or freelancers. It includes different features for enterprise resource planning (ERP) and customer relationship management (CRM) but also other features for different activities.

Features 
There are several feature modules that can be enabled or disabled, as needed.
This software is free under GNU General Public License 3.0. It is a web-based application, and can therefore be used wherever an internet service is available.
Dolibarr aims to offer free open source ERP and CRM features for people with no technical knowledge, by providing a simple solution.

Dolibarr includes all the important features of an ERP CRM suite. It is modular and is thus characterized by its ease of installation and use, despite the large number of features.

Main Dolibarr features include:

Main modules 

 Sales Management
 Purchase Management
 Commercial proposals management
 Customer Relationship Management
 Products and services catalog
 Stock Management
 Event Management
 Bank account management
 Address book
 Calendar
 Foundation-members management
 Payments management
 Donations management
 Contracts management
 Standing orders management
 Shipping management
 Point of sale
 Electronic document management
 Project Management
 Manufacturing resource planning
 Human resource management
 Surveys
 PDF and OpenDocument generation
 Reporting
 Wizard to help to export/import data
 LDAP connectivity

Miscellaneous 
 Multi-user, with several permissions levels for each feature.
 Multi-language
 Multi-currency
 User-friendly
 Assorted skins
 Code is highly customizable (modular).
 Works with MySQL 5.1 or higher, PostgreSQL 9.1.0 or higher 
 Works with PHP 5.6 or higher, (Max 7.4.*)

Missing features 
These features are not available in the most recent version of Dolibarr:

 Manages (by default) only one company/foundation (mono-company). This means you need to install the software twice if you want to manage two different companies, or install an external addons.
 No Webmail (not to be confused with a mailing-list).

Architecture 
Dolibarr is written in PHP. It uses MySQL, MariaDB or PostgreSQL databases.
It works with a wide choice of hosting services or servers. Dolibarr works with all PHP configurations and does not require any additional PHP modules.

Dolibarr can also be installed from an auto-installer file that is available for Windows, Mac and Linux. This is aimed at enabling users with no technical knowledge to install Dolibarr and its prerequisites (such as Apache, MySQL and PHP). This version is called DoliWamp for Windows users, DoliDeb for Debian or Ubuntu users, DoliRpm for Fedora, Redhat, Mandriva or OpenSuse users.

History 
Dolibarr was started by Rodolphe Quiedeville in April 2002. At this time, Jean-Louis Bergamo began writing the foundation management module. Version 1.0 was released in September 2003.

In July 2008, Laurent Destailleur - the main contributor and author of AWStats - took over from Rodolphe Quideville as the main developer. A foundation and several user groups have been created in several countries. The first was set up in France, the country where Dolibarr is most well-known. Dolibarr's popularity in France increased after it was freely distributed by a number of government agencies to people starting up new businesses. The software is now also used in many other countries and translated into more than 50 languages.

Awards 
 2003
 1st in the category "Management Company" at the Les Trophées du Libre contest.
 2014, 2015, 2016
 Several times project of the week (March 2014, September 2015, September 2016 ...)
 2020
 Trophy Naos d'Or 
 Project of the month December 2020

ERP Research Regarding Dolibarr  
Dolibarr ERP also pique by some researcher for ERP studies like future of ERP, Multi Branch ERP Solution, integration with several e-commerce, ERP Evolution, reporting analysis

See also 

Comparison of accounting software
Other ERP/CRM software: Compiere, Odoo, Openbravo, Tryton
List of free and open source software packages

References

External links
 
 
 
 

Free ERP software
ERP software
Customer relationship management software
2003 software
Free customer relationship management software
Free accounting software
Enterprise resource planning software for Linux